Charlie Shotwell (born July 17, 2007) is an American actor. He started acting professionally at the age of six. His first notable role being the young Nai Cash in the 2016 comedy-drama film Captain Fantastic for which he received nominations for SAG Awards and Young Artist Awards. He was lead of the Netflix horror film Eli and the coming-of-age psychological thriller John and the Hole, and appeared in the comedy film Troop Zero.

Life and career
Shotwell was born in Madison, Wisconsin. In 2015, Shotwell made his acting debut with the war-drama Man Down, playing the son of Shia LaBeouf and Kate Mara's character; Dito Montiel directed the film. He then starred as the youngest member of a survivalist left-wing philosophers' family in the Matt Ross directed comedy-drama Captain Fantastic. In 2017, Shotwell played the young Brian Walls in the Destin Daniel Cretton drama The Glass Castle. Later, he appeared in the Tali Shalom Ezer romance-drama My Days of Mercy. Soon after, Shotwell guest-starred in the episode "Lily's Law" of the tv-series Chicago Justice. Shotwell soon gained further recognition as a young John Paul Getty III in the 2017 Ridley Scott thriller All the Money in the World. Then in 2018, he performed as an English convict in the drama-thriller The Nightingale.

In 2019, Shotwell starred in the title role of the Netflix horror film Eli, directed by Ciarán Foy. Also that year, he played Joseph in the Amazon Studios comedy film Troop Zero, about 1970s girl scouts. In 2020 appears in family-thriller The Nest, playing Benjamin O'Hara, directed by Sean Durkin. Also in 2020, Shotwell appears on the horror podcast Borrasca by QCODE, and in the pilot episode Staged Dad on YouTube.

In 2021 he played John, in the coming-of-age psychological thriller John and the Hole, directed by Pascual Sisto and written by Nicolás Giacobone. Commenting on Charlie Shotwell's performance in Variety, Peter Debruge said that "child actor (...) goes deep in creepy family portrait [a] remarkable new talent Pascual Sisto's feature debut offers an unsettling look at a kid with something missing where his conscience should be." Also in 2021, he plays Hurley, in the horror film The Manson Brothers Midnight Zombie Massacre, by Max Martini.

In February 2022, a short film "Whiskey Pete" was released on YouTube, directed by Stefan Colson, in which Shotwell plays the kid. Also in 2022, Shotwell played the young Michael Morbius in the superhero film Morbius, and Jules Brennen in Chorus, short by Daniel J. Egbert.

Personal life 
Charlie Shotwell has three siblings, who are also actors: Jimmy and Henry Shotwell, and a step sister, Shree Crooks, who is Greg Crooks' daughter. They worked acting together in the pilot episode of Staged Dad and the short film Whiskey Pete.

Filmography

Film

Television

Web

Awards and nominations

References

External links 
 
 
 

2007 births
Living people
American male child actors
21st-century American male actors
Actors from Madison, Wisconsin